The Botswana Ground Forces is the army of the country of Botswana, and the land component of the Botswana Defence Force.

History

The Botswana Defence Force was raised in April 1977 by an Act of Parliament called the 'BDF Act NO 13 of 1977. At its formation, Lieutenant General Mompati Merafhe (retired and former Vice President of the Republic of Botswana (now deceased)) became its first Commander. The former President of the Republic of Botswana, Lieutenant General Seretse Khama Ian Khama, then Brigadier, was the Deputy Commander. 
Unusually for an African military force, and chiefly attributable to its being founded after Botswana's independence, the Botswana Ground Force was not formed from colonial units formed by a colonising power, but rather were formed from the remains of the Botswana Mounted Police Unit, previously known as the Bechuanaland Mounted Police, a unit of the British South Africa Police.

The contemporary roles of the Defence Force are broad for a conventional military, suggesting that the government of Botswana and the BDF subscribe to a wide view of ‘security’ and consider the Defence Force an appropriate agency for attaining much of it, an issue that has been discussed even in the BDF's own internal media. It is expected that the BDF in general is meant to be an apolitical instrument of the state.

The current stated mission of the Botswana Ground Force is:
To defend the country and provide for the security of Botswana, participate in external security cooperation activities, and contribute in domestic support operations, with the aim of:
 Ensuring national security and stability
 Protecting the people and their properties
 Protecting the constitution of Botswana to guarantee the rule of law
 Defending Botswana's territorial integrity on land and in the air
 Preserving Botswana as a free, independent and sovereign state
 Aiding civil authorities in domestic support operations
 Strengthening Botswana's international relations by participating in regional and international security cooperation activities

Structure and organisation
The commander-in-chief of the BDF is Mokgweetsi Masisi, the current President of Botswana. Answering to him is Lieutenant General Placid Segokgo.

The various units of the Botswana Ground Force are as follows:

 1st Armoured Brigade (Gaborone)
 1st Infantry Brigade (mechanised brigade at Gaborone)
 2nd Infantry Brigade (motorized brigade at Francistown)
 3rd Infantry Brigade (motorized brigade at Ghanzi)
 1st Commando Regiment (Gaborone)
 Four independent infantry battalions
 Two armored-artillery brigades
 One combat engineering regiment
 1 air defense battalion
 Army river-wing (including diving unit)

Ranks and insignia

The BGF and the Botswana Air Force maintain the same rank system, which is loosely based on British or Commonwealth rank systems. The ranks are as follows:
Commissioned officer ranks
The rank insignia of commissioned officers.

Other ranks
The rank insignia of non-commissioned officers and enlisted personnel.

Equipment and vehicles

The BDF uses a wide array of modern weapons and vehicles. Its suppliers are Russia and Western nations, including Switzerland, the United States, France, Germany, the Netherlands, Austria, Belgium, Italy, and the United Kingdom.

In 2016 the Ministry of Defence of Botswana ordered 45 Piranha 8×8 armoured vehicles made by General Dynamics Switzerland.

References

Sources
 
 
 

Botswana
Ground Force
Military units and formations established in 1977
1977 establishments in Botswana